Iain Gobha na Hearadh (1790-1852), known as John Morrison in English, was a Bard who composed Christian poetry in Scottish Gaelic.

Gobha na Hearadh was born in Ròghadal on the Isle of Harris. One of his writings was the long poem 'An Nuadh Bhreith, no Gleachd an t-Seann Duine agus an Duin' Òig' ("The New Birth, or the Struggle between the Elderly and the Young.

Poems 

 'An Nuadh Bhreith, no Gleachd an t-Seann Duine agus an Duin' Òig'
 'An Ionndrainn' ("Longing")
 'A' Mhisg' ("Drunkenness")

References

External links 
 BBC Alba Bliadhna nan Òran: Iain Gobha na Hearadh (Scottish Gaelic)
 GRD: Iain Gobha na Hearadh (Iain Moireasdan) (Scottish Gaelic)

18th-century Scottish Gaelic poets
19th-century Scottish Gaelic poets
People from Harris, Outer Hebrides
Calvinist and Reformed poets
Christian poets
Scottish Christian poets
1790 births
1852 deaths